Gordon Ian Armstrong (born 15 July 1967 in Newcastle upon Tyne, England) is a former professional footballer who played as a midfielder. He now works as a football agent, and has amongst the players he manages a number of current and former players from Burnley Football Club.

During his career he played for Sunderland, Bristol City, Northampton Town, Bury, Burnley, Accrington Stanley, Radcliffe Borough and Stalybridge Celtic. Whilst at Sunderland, he played in the 1992 FA Cup Final where they lost to Liverpool.

He is the brother of former Reading and Sheffield United left back Chris Armstrong.

His son, James, played for the Sunderland F.C. Academy, as well for Hull City A.F.C.

References

External links 

1967 births
English footballers
Footballers from Newcastle upon Tyne
Sunderland A.F.C. players
Bristol City F.C. players
Northampton Town F.C. players
Accrington Stanley F.C. players
Radcliffe F.C. players
Stalybridge Celtic F.C. players
Bury F.C. players
Burnley F.C. players
Living people
English Football League players
National League (English football) players
Association football midfielders
FA Cup Final players